Richmond Peak is the central and culminating peak (3,595 m) of the Toney Mountain massif in Marie Byrd Land. Mapped by United States Geological Survey (USGS) from ground surveys and U.S. Navy air photos, 1959–71. Named by Advisory Committee on Antarctic Names (US-ACAN) for Addison E. Richmond, Jr., of the U.S. Dept. of State, Chairman of the Interagency Committee on Antarctica, 1971–72.
 

Mountains of Marie Byrd Land